R31 or R-31 may refer to:

Automobiles 
 Nissan Pintara (R31), a compact car sold in Australia
 Nissan Skyline (R31), a mid-size car
 Renault R31, a Formula One racing car

Aviation 
 R31 (airship), of the Royal Navy
 Renard R.31, a Belgian reconnaissance aircraft
 Rubik R-31 Dupla, a Hungarian training glider

Other uses 
 R-31 (missile), a Soviet submarine-launched ballistic missile
 R31 (South Africa), a road
 Chlorofluoromethane, a refrigerant
 Grendel R31, an American semi-automatic carbine
 Herero language
 , an aircraft carrier of the Royal Navy
 R31: Contact with acids liberates toxic gas, a risk phrase